Bernd Hölzenbein (born 9 March  1946) is a German former professional footballer who played as a striker or winger. At international level, he was a member of the West German team that won the World Cup in 1974. Hölzenbein is best known for being fouled in the final against the Netherlands, which led to the Germans' equalizing penalty.

Playing career

A qualified merchant, Hölzenbein debuted for Eintracht Frankfurt in the Bundesliga in 1967 to serve for this club until his departure in 1981. A three times German Cup winner with them in 1974, 1975 and 1981, Hölzenbein also won the UEFA Cup with Frankfurt in 1980. His output of 160 goals in his 420 Bundesliga matches is still club record achievement for Frankfurt.

He joined Fort Lauderdale Strikers in the United States in 1981. He later played for Memphis Americans and Baltimore Blast in the Major Indoor Soccer League.

In his international career, Hölzenbein scored five goals in forty appearances for West Germany between 1973 and 1978. One of his international goals was the equalizing goal in a 2–2 draw against Czechoslovakia in the UEFA Euro 1976 Final, which West Germany lost on penalties. However, he became the oldest player to score in a Euro final, aged 30 years and 103 days.

Honours
Eintracht Frankfurt
 UEFA Europa League: 1979–80
 DFB-Pokal: 1973–74, 1974–75, 1980–81

West Germany
 FIFA World Cup: 1974

Individual
 kicker Bundesliga Team of the Season: 1976

References

External links 
 

1946 births
Living people
German footballers
Association football forwards
Association football wingers
Germany international footballers
FIFA World Cup-winning players
1974 FIFA World Cup players
UEFA Euro 1976 players
1978 FIFA World Cup players
UEFA Cup winning players
Bundesliga players
North American Soccer League (1968–1984) players
Major Indoor Soccer League (1978–1992) players
Eintracht Frankfurt players
Fort Lauderdale Strikers (1977–1983) players
Memphis Americans players
Baltimore Blast (1980–1992) players
FSV Salmrohr players
West German expatriate footballers
Expatriate soccer players in the United States
People from Limburg-Weilburg
Sportspeople from Giessen (region)
Footballers from Hesse
West German footballers
West German expatriate sportspeople in the United States